Pandari Bai (1930 – 29 January 2003) was an Indian actress who worked in South Indian cinema, mostly in Kannada cinema during the 1950s, 1960s and 1970s. She is considered Kannada cinema's first successful heroine. She has acted as both heroine and mother to stalwarts such as Rajkumar, M. G. Ramachandran, Sivaji Ganesan. She was the heroine in Rajkumar's debut movie Bedara Kannappa and also Sivaji's debut movie Parasakthi. She has acted in over 1,000 films in Kannada, Tamil, Telugu and Hindi.  Bai was honoured by  Kalaimamani from the Tamil Nadu government.

Career
Pandaribai began her career in acting in plays based on mythological stories before making her film debut in 1943 with the Kannada language film, Vani. She appeared in the 1954 Kannada film Bedara Kannappa opposite Rajkumar. In the film, she played Neela, wife of Kanna (played by Rajkumar), a hunter. She established herself as a lead actress portraying a woman with a "progressive" image assuming the burdens of a feudal patriarchy in films such as Sant Sakhu (1955) and Rayara Sose (1957). In 1959, she appeared in Abba Aa Hudugi, with her sister Mynavathi. The film is considered a landmark in Kannada cinema.

Later in her career Pandari Bai played the mother of stars older than her, most of whom had played the lead with her in her earlier years.

Awards and honours
 The lesson "Gunasagari Pandari Bai" is added to the class IX Kannada Language Textbook in Karnataka state to honour the legendary actress.
 2001 - Filmfare Awards South - Lifetime Achievement Award
 1994-95 - Dr. Rajkumar Lifetime Achievement Award from Karnataka Government
 1968-69 - Karnataka State Film Award for Best Supporting Actress - Namma Makkalu
 1967-68 - Karnataka State Film Award for Best Supporting Actress - Belli Moda
 1965 - Kalaimamani Award from Tamil Nadu Government

Filmography

References

External links

Potpourri of titbits about Pandari Bai

Actresses from Karnataka
Actresses in Kannada cinema
Actresses in Telugu cinema
1928 births
2003 deaths
Kannada actresses
Actresses in Tamil cinema
Indian film actresses
20th-century Indian actresses
Actresses in Hindi cinema
Tamil Nadu State Film Awards winners
People from Uttara Kannada